Wyrick is a surname. Notable people with the surname include:

Blair Wyrick of Single File, a band from Westminster, Colorado
Charles Wyrick, Oklahoma Senator from District 1, which includes Craig, Delaware and Ottawa counties
Jimmy Wyrick (born 1976), former American football cornerback in the National Football League
Mabel Martin Wyrick (1913–2003), writer whose published books include If Quilts Could Talk
Steve Wyrick (born 1970), American magician from Garland, Texas
Travis Wyrick, music producer and owner of Lakeside Studios in Knoxville, Tennessee
V. Neil Wyrick (born 1928), writer and minister in the Presbyterian Church (USA)

See also
WRCK (disambiguation)
WRIC (disambiguation)
WYRK